The following is a list of equipment of the Bangladesh Army.

Soldier gear and equipments

Service uniform

Communication equipments

Infantry weapons

Firearms

Anti-tank weapons

Mortars

Vehicles and artillery

Combat tanks

Armored vehicles

Artillery systems

Air defence systems

Radars and fire control systems

Engineering vehicles

Logistics and utility vehicles

Aircraft of aviation group

Watercrafts of Riverine Brigade

See also
 Bangladesh Army Aviation Group

References

External links 
 
 Official Website of Bangladesh Army
 Library of Congress Country Studies assessment of Bangladesh Army (1988)
 Janes.com
 www.globalsecurity.org
 www.bof.gov.bd
 www.bmtf.com.bd

Bangladesh Army
Military equipment of Bangladesh
B
Equipment